Pomona College is an elite private liberal arts college in Claremont, California, and the founding member of the Claremont Colleges consortium. Many notable individuals have been affiliated with the college as graduates, non-graduating attendees, faculty, staff, or administrators.

Since its founding in 1887, Pomona has graduated  classes of students. As of the   semester, the college enrolls approximately  students and has roughly 25,000 living alumni. The top industries for graduates include technology; education; consulting and professional services; finance; government, law, and politics; arts, entertainment, and media; healthcare and social services; nonprofits; and research.

As of the   semester, Pomona employs  faculty members. The college has had  presidents, the first four of whom were Congregational ministers.

Notable alumni

Arts and letters

Visual art

Film and television

Music

Journalism and non-fiction writing

Writing

Other

Government and law

U.S. Senators and Congresspeople

Federal officials

State and city officials

Judges

Diplomats

Activists

Military

Business

Science

Religion

Academia

College presidents

Professors and academics

Athletics

Notable faculty

Presidents of Pomona College

From 1888 to 1890, trustee Charles B. Sumner was the college's "financial agent with supervisory authority", and assumed many of the duties of a president. The subsequent presidents are:

See also
 List of Claremont Colleges people

Notes

References

External links

Pomona College official timeline
Pomona College alumni website
Pomona College honorary degree recipients

Lists of people by university or college in California